HMS Leopard was a 50-gun  fourth rate of the Royal Navy. She served during the French Revolutionary and Napoleonic Wars, and was notable for the actions of her captain in 1807, which were emblematic of the tensions that later erupted in the War of 1812 between Britain and America. She was wrecked in 1814.

Construction and commissioning
She was first ordered on 16 October 1775, named on 13 November 1775 and laid down at Portsmouth Dockyard in January 1776. She was reordered in May 1785, ten years after having first been laid down, and construction began at Sheerness Dockyard on 7 May 1785. Work was at first overseen by Master Shipwright Martin Ware until December 1785, and after that, by John Nelson until March 1786, when William Rule took over. She was launched from Sheerness on 24 April 1790, and was completed by 26 May 1790. She was commissioned for service in June that year under her first commander, Captain John Blankett.

Service
The China fleet of East Indiamen left Macao on 21 March 1791. Leopard and  escorted them as far as Java Head.

French Revolutionary Wars
On 24 October 1798, Leopard captured the French privateer vessel Apollon, which was under the command of Captain La Vaillant. On 22 August 1800 Leopard captured Clarice.

Because Leopard served in the navy's Egyptian campaign (8 March – 8 September 1801), her officers and crew qualified for the clasp "Egypt" to the Naval General Service Medal that the Admiralty issued in 1847 to all surviving claimants.

Napoleonic Wars
During the night of 20 April Lady Burges wrecked on a reef off Boa Vista, Cape Verde. Boats from the convoy were able to rescue 150 of the 184 people on board; 34 or 38 drowned. Leopard left the convoy at Latitude 9°N, and arrived at Spithead on 8 June.

The Chesapeake-Leopard affair

In an attempt to recover the British deserters, Captain Salusbury Pryce Humphreys, commanding Leopard, hailed Chesapeake and requested permission to search her. Commodore James Barron of Chesapeake refused and Leopard opened fire. Caught unprepared, Barron surrendered and Humphreys sent boarders to search for the deserters. The boarding party seized four deserters from the Royal Navy–three Americans and one British-born sailor–and took them to Halifax, where the British sailor, Jenkin Ratford, was hanged for desertion. The Americans were initially sentenced to 500 lashes, but had their sentence commuted; Britain also offered to return them to America.

The incident caused severe political repercussions in the United States, and nearly led to the two nations going to war.

Leopard escorted a convoy from Portsmouth on 6 May 1808.

She then was part of the convoy assigned to Josias Rowley in the Mauritius campaign of 1809–11 in the Indian Ocean.

Fate
In 1812, Leopard had her guns removed and was converted to a troopship. On 28 June 1814 she was en route from Britain to Quebec, carrying a contingent of 475 Royal Scots Guardsmen, when she grounded on Anticosti Island in heavy fog. Leopard was destroyed, but all on board survived.

Leopard in fiction
In Patrick O'Brian's novel Desolation Island, the fifth book of the Aubrey–Maturin series, Jack Aubrey commands Leopard on a cruise through the Atlantic and Indian oceans after the Chesapeake-Leopard Affair, a voyage which included the sinking of the fictional Dutch ship of the line Waakzaamheid, and a disastrous collision with an iceberg. In the sixth book, The Fortune of War, the ship is left at a British station in the Dutch East Indies, unable to support her complement of guns. She is called the "horrible old Leopard" in the fourth book in the series The Mauritius Command, and in other books in the series, and ends its days as a store ship sailing from the English Channel to the Baltic.

Game developer Lucas Pope based the layout of the titular ship in his game Return of the Obra Dinn on the layout of HMS Leopard.

References

Bibliography

 
 
 

 

War of 1812 ships of the United Kingdom
Shipwrecks in the Gulf of Saint Lawrence
Maritime incidents in 1806
Maritime incidents in 1814
1790 ships
Ships of the line of the Royal Navy
Ships built in Sheerness